Fútbol Sala García is a futsal club based in Santa Coloma de Gramenet, city of the province of Barcelona in the autonomous community of Catalonia.

The club was founded in 1975 and her pavilion is Pavelló Nou with capacity of 2,200 seaters.

The club's main sponsor is Catgas Energia.

History
Marfil Santa Coloma was founded in 1975 as Fútbol Sala Indústrias García. In 1999, they reach the finals of División of Honor. In 2001, the club was very close to be wound up. But in 2001, a local entrepreneur, Alfonso García, owner of Marfil Alella wineries, bought the club, and renamed him as Fútbol Sala Marfil Santa Coloma.

During 2001–2015 period, the club was named FS Marfil Santa Coloma, but in summer 2015 changed its official naming to FS García.

Club names
FS Industrias García - (1975–2001)
FS Marfil Santa Coloma - (2001–2015)
FS García - (2015– present)

Season to season

25 seasons in Primera División
3 seasons in Segunda División

Current squad

Notable players
 Óscar Redondo

References

External links
Official website
Profile at LNFS.es

Catalan futsal clubs
Santa Coloma de Gramenet
Futsal clubs established in 1975
1975 establishments in Spain